Malcolm Ivan McNeill (born 1945) is a jazz singer from New Zealand, based in Christchurch. He has performed and recorded with a range of international performers, including Dame Cleo Laine and Dame Kiri Te Kanawa.  With the latter, he recorded the music album Heart to Heart.  He has recorded with the Sydney Symphony Orchestra and has nine studio albums.

He was born in Christchurch on 8 April 1945, and educated at Christchurch Boys' High School and the University of Canterbury.

References

New Zealand jazz singers
1945 births
Living people
20th-century New Zealand male singers
21st-century New Zealand male singers
People educated at Christchurch Boys' High School
University of Canterbury alumni